Isola di San Clemente (San Clemente Island) is a small island in the Venetian Lagoon in Italy. For centuries it housed a monastic settlement, and more recently an asylum. It is now the site of a luxury hotel.

Location

San Clemente Island lies in the Venetian Lagoon between Giudecca and the Lido. The island covers 6 hectares (15 acres), of which 1.34 is edified.

History

The island was first settled in 1131, when Venetian merchant Pietro Gattilesso funded the construction of the church of San Clemente and a hospice for pilgrims and soldiers destined for the Holy Land. The name is dedicated to Pope Clement I, who died as a martyr according to legend and who is patron of seamen. The complex was run by Augustine canons, while the entire island was under the jurisdiction of the patriarch of Grado Enrico Dandolo. In 1288 the relics of Saint Anianus - the first successors of St. Mark as Patriarch of Alexandria - were brought to the San Clemente church.

After experiencing a slow decline in the course of the 14th century, San Clemente gained fresh life in 1432, when Pope Eugene IV moved the order of Lateran canons - also known as the Charity (Carità) - to the island. Thanks to donations provided by wealthy Venetian families, the canons began work on the restoration of the church and enlargement of the monastery.

In 1643, to fulfil a vow made during the plague epidemic that struck the city in 1630, Venetians funded the building of a new chapel, modelled on the Holy House of Loreto, inside the San Clemente church. This “church in a church” is still a main feature of the construction.

Camaldolese Hermits of Monte Corona purchased the island in 1645. The Venetian nobility provided them with financial assistance to restore the church and monastery, and expand the island to add additional houses to the complex. In 1652 the Morosini family sponsored the restoration of the church façade by Andrea Cominelli, in order to pay tribute to the family's members Francesco and Tommaso, who died in the War of Candia.

The fall of the Republic of Venice in 1797 impacted San Clemente. Also, owing to the suppression of religious orders by Napoleon, in 1810 the Camaldolese monks left the island, which became a military garrison.

From 1844 the island housed a mental hospital, illustrating the 'confinement of the mad' and their exclusion from society common to the period. This female asylum housed women of Venice who were considered insane, earning a reputation amongst Venetians who in time equated 'going to San Clemente' with going mad, much in the way 'Bedlam' has been referred to within England. According to historian Andrew Scull, Mussolini sent his first wife Ida Dalser to San Clemente, effectively incarcerating her. The asylum was abandoned in 1992 before being bought and developed into the hotel complex it houses today.

Gateway to Venice
Between the 15th and 16th centuries, San Clemente became known as the “gateway to Venice”. It became standard practice to take the Bucentaur (Bucintoro), the Doge's ceremonial barge, to the island to meet distinguished visitors. On the return journey to the Grand Canal, the guests were entertained by a variety of spectacles and performances.

Writing of Venice in 1493, Marino Sanudo described the Bucentaur as “a marvel, in which the Prince and Senate go to any great lord visiting the city; they go to San Clemente or elsewhere, depending on the direction from which the visitor is coming”.

Hotel
The buildings on the private island were renovated in 2003 and converted into a luxury hotel. In September 2013 it was announced that a subsidiary of the Permak construction group of Turkey had bought the property. Permak launched further renovations between 2013 and 2014, while retaining the historic character. The property is currently managed by Kempinski Group, which reopened the hotel as San Clemente Palace Kempinski in March 2016. The hotel has 190 rooms and suites, three restaurants and three bars, an outdoor swimming pool and a tennis court as well as a golf pitching course.

References

Sources 
 Giovanna Cecconello, Carlo Giuliani, Michele Sgobba, San Clemente: progetto per un'isola, CLUVA, 1980
 Martina Carraro, L'isola di San Clemente a Venezia. Storia, restauro e nuove funzioni, Carsa, 2003
 V. M. Coronelli, Isolario dell’Atlante Veneto, Venezia, 1696-1698

Islands of the Venetian Lagoon
Private islands of Italy